Rahim Meftah (born August 15, 1980 in Tizi Ouzou) is an Algerian former professional footballer who played as a defender.

Club career
 1999–2007 JS Kabylie
 2007–2008 USM Alger

Honours
 Won the Algerian league twice with JS Kabylie in 2004 and 2006
 Won the CAF Cup twice with JS Kabylie in 2001 and 2002

External links
 
 DZFoot Profile

1980 births
Living people
Footballers from Tizi Ouzou
Kabyle people
Algerian footballers
Association football defenders
JS Kabylie players
USM Alger players
21st-century Algerian people